Banjosa Lake is an artificial lake and a tourist resort  from the city of Rawalakot in Poonch District of Azad Kashmir, Pakistan. It is located at an altitude of .This lake is 160 kilometers away from Rawalpindi.

The lake is surrounded by dense pine forest and mountains. The Lake is accessible by a metalled road from Rawalakot.The lake is frozen in winter people walk on it and also skitt on ice.

Climate 
The weather in the area remains cool in summer and cold in the winter.There is cold season in summer andr very very cold in winter.

Accommodation 

Some rest houses and huts of AJK Tourism and Archeology Department, Pakistan Public Works Department (PWD) and Pearl Development Authority are located here. A few hotels, guest houses and tuck shops also exist near the lake. A few hotels and rest houses are also located in this town.

See also 
 Toli Pir
 Rawalakot
 List of lakes in Pakistan

References 

Poonch District, Pakistan
Lakes of Azad Kashmir
Spa towns in Pakistan
Tourist attractions in Azad Kashmir